Chomphon, also spelled Chom Phon, is a khwaeng (subdistrict) of Chatuchak District, Bangkok, Thailand.

Denomination
The name Chomphon (literally: "Field Marshal") after the name of the soi (alley) Chomphon or Soi Lat Phrao 15, off Lat Phrao Road in the beginning phase that is situated in the area, not far from Lat Phrao Square. This alley used to be home to RS, one of Thailand's leading music labels and entertainment companies.

The area was declared a subdistrict in late 2003, along with four other subdistricts of Chatuchak.

Geography
Chomphon is the southeast part of the district. Other areas that surround it include (from north clockwise): Chan Kasem in its district (Ratchadaphisek Road is a borderline), 	Din Daeng of Din Daeng (Khlong Bang Sue and Khlong Nam Kaew are the borderlines), Sam Sen Nai in Phaya Thai (Khlong Bang Sue is a borderline), Chatuchak in its district (Phaholyothin Road is a borderline), respectively.

Cites

Subdistricts of Bangkok
Chatuchak district